The remaining Ottoman Empire era monuments of Ilok, town in eastern Croatia, include the hammam and the türbe which makes the town the location with the largest number of preserved Ottoman buildings in Slavonia. The hammam in Ilok is the only preserved Ottoman era hammam in Croatia. Evliya Çelebi, Ottoman explorer who travelled through the Empire, described the hammam of Ilok in his recollections from the town.

Together with Požega, Ilok gained the town status during the Ottoman rule over the region. The town of Ilok was together with Sremska Mitrovica one of the seats of the Sanjak of Syrmia of the Budin Eyalet. Systematic demolition of all symbols of Islam happened in the late 17th century after the region of southern Ottoman Hungary was reconquered by the Habsburg monarchy, making the monuments in Ilok some of the last architectural traces of the Ottoman era in modern day Croatia.

See also
 Suleiman Bridge
 Gunja Mosque
 Rumelia
 Hundred Years' Croatian–Ottoman War
 Great Turkish War
 Croatian-Slavonian-Dalmatian theater in Great Turkish War
 Edward Rehatsek
 Turkish Springs in Stari Ledinci

References

Buildings and structures in Vukovar-Syrmia County
Buildings and structures of the Ottoman Empire
Ilok
Ottoman baths
Ottoman mausoleums
Ottoman period in the history of Croatia